Sightless is a 2020 American psychological thriller film written and directed by Cooper Karl, based on his 2017 short film of the same name. The film stars Madelaine Petsch and Alexander Koch.

The film had its world premiere at Dances with Films Festival on September 2, 2020. It was released digitally and on demand on September 29, 2020, by MarVista Entertainment.

Plot

Following a brutal attack, violinist Ellen Ashland (Madelaine Petsch) is left blind. Clayton (Alexander Koch) is hired to care for her and she begins to adjust to life without her sight. One night, Ellen hears a distressed woman's voice; she initially believes the woman is in her apartment but then realises the noise is coming through the vent. The following morning, her neighbour shows up and introduces herself as Lana.

As time goes on, Ellen grows suspicious of Lana. When she touches Lana's face, she feels a wound with stitches and is alarmed. Lana reacts by warning Ellen to trust no one and then flees Ellen's apartment upon the arrival of her abusive husband, Russo. Ellen contacts Detective Bryce who sends Officer Neiman to check on Lana; he confirms she is okay and does not have any recent wounds. Ellen expresses her concerns to Clayton who starts to show a romantic interest in Ellen, but when he confesses his feelings, she turns him down.

When Clayton leaves the apartment one afternoon, another person enters and attacks Ellen. She manages to dial 911 before she passes out. She is awaken by a paramedic and Detective Bryce who reassures her that after Clayton left her apartment, nobody else entered. Detective Bryce confirms to Ellen that her friend Sasha, who was having an affair with Ellen's ex-husband, is the prime suspect in Ellen's attack. Feeling alone and unsure of anyone, Ellen decides to commit suicide. She writes letters to her brother, Sasha, and Clayton, and then jumps from her apartment balcony.

Ellen wakes up on the floor of a soundproof room and quickly realises the apartment she was staying in was fake, and all of the noises "outside" were coming from a speaker system. She explores the hallway only to find she cannot escape. Ellen goes to Lana for help, who tells her that this is home. Clayton then arrives to cook Ellen dinner and she realises all of the people she has interacted with since her attack - the doctors, the detective, the paramedic, Russo - were all Clayton, dressed up differently. Ellen knocks Clayton unconscious and finds Lana who reveals she is Clayton's sister and she helped him kidnap Ellen. She then tells Ellen their only hope of escape is by using the hidden vent in Clayton's room.

Clayton finds and once again captures Ellen. He confesses that after his mother's death, his father kept him captive in the basement for three years, during which time Lana played Ellen's music for him, thus resulting in his obsession. Ellen tries to escape via the vent and finds a vial, which she realises is the same substance that was used in her attack that made her lose her sight. She finds her way back to her apartment, chased by Clayton, and sprays the substance in his face. Upon seeing Clayton disabled, Lana guides Ellen to an exit into the outside world.

Six months later, Ellen prepares to go on stage to the sound of an elated crowd, as an assistant asks her if she needs any help.

Cast
 Madelaine Petsch as Ellen Ashland
 Alexander Koch as Clayton
 December Ensminger as Lana Latch
 Lee Jones as Russo Latch
 Deniz Akdeniz as Nurse Omar
 Jarrod Crawford as Detective Bryce
 Matthew Yang King as Doctor Katsuro
 Mikandrew as Paramedic Rafferty
 Samuel Gostnell as Officer Neiman

Production
Principal photography on the film began in late May and ended on May 31, 2019.

Reception
From Ready Set Cut, Jonathon Wilson gave the film two stars out of five, criticizing it for its predictable twist, calling it "a drab", and summarizing it as "the kind of film that has been sat on a shelf for a while for reasons that are entirely understandable". Johnny Loftus, giving his review from Decider, compared the film and its ending to Wait Until Dark (1967) and Shutter Island (2010), and recommended readers to watch it online. Writing for the Australian Broadcasting Corporation, a journalist gave the film three stars and a half out of five, and said that "Sightless ticks the boxes for [...] an over-the-top thriller that is not afraid to ramp things up to eleven, its manic climax just one of its many enjoyable charms."

References

External links
 

2020 films
2020 independent films
2020 psychological thriller films
American independent films
American psychological thriller films
Features based on short films
Films about blind people
Films about stalking
Films set in Seattle
2020s English-language films
2020s American films